"A Pillow of Winds" is the second track from Pink Floyd's 1971 album Meddle.

Music and lyrics
This soft acoustic love song may be quite uncharacteristic of the band's previous and future material. Guitarist David Gilmour composed the chord sequence using an open E tuning (EBEG#BE), played in a series of arpeggios, composed the melody and maybe part of the lyrics (along with Roger Waters). This song also features slide guitar work by Gilmour, as well as a fretless bass played by Waters. The song begins and ends in the key of E major, with a darker middle section (following the lyric "and the candle dies") in the parallel minor, E minor. Both the E major and E minor chords feature the ninth, making this song one of many Pink Floyd songs to feature a prominent E minor added ninth chord, "Em(add9)". Throughout most of the song, the bass line remains on E as a pedal point, creating a drone. A chord named "G#m/E" is more accurately called an E major seventh chord, "Emaj7", and a "Bm/E" is just as equally named an "E7sus2". In the instrumental interlude, however, the chords change completely to A minor and B minor chords, leaving the E bass drone for a time before returning to E major.

According to Nick Mason, the song's title originates from a possible hand in the game of mahjong, with which the band had become enamoured while touring.

Reception
In a review for the Meddle album, Jean-Charles Costa of Rolling Stone described "A Pillow of Winds", along with "San Tropez", as an "ozone ballad". He further described the two as "pleasant little acoustic numbers hovering over a bizarre back-drop of weird sounds". Classic Rock Review described "A Pillow of Winds" as "a soft acoustic love song" that's reminiscent of previous albums Ummagumma and Atom Heart Mother. They went on further, saying: "this second song could not be in more contrast to the first one".

Personnel
David Gilmour – double-tracked lead vocals, acoustic and electric guitars, electric and acoustic slide guitars, pedal steel guitar
Richard Wright – Hammond organ, piano
Nick Mason – hi-hats
Roger Waters – fretless bass

References

External links

Pink Floyd songs
1971 songs
Psychedelic songs
Songs written by David Gilmour
Songs written by Roger Waters
Song recordings produced by David Gilmour
Song recordings produced by Roger Waters
Song recordings produced by Richard Wright (musician)
Song recordings produced by Nick Mason